Doris Brown may be:
 Doris Brown Heritage, world class runner and coach
 Doris Browne (singer), noted R&B singer
 Doris Browne, Viscountess Castlerosse